Altamont Corridor Express, or ACE, is a commuter rail service in California's San Joaquin, Alameda, and Santa Clara counties. , the service has ten stations. Additional stations, most in the Central Valley, are planned as part of several expansion projects

Stations

Future stations

References

Notes

External links

Altamont Corridor Express – Stations

L
Altamont Corridor Express
Altamont Corridor Express
Altamont Corridor Express